Petrolia Park was a ballpark located in Okmulgee, Oklahoma, United States. It served as the home of the Okmulgee Merchants, a Negro league baseball team, as well as the Okmulgee Drillers of the Western Association from 1923 to 1927.

References

Defunct sports venues in Oklahoma